Steamroller Productions is a Los Angeles-based production company started by Steven Seagal in 1990. When Seagal became partners with Julius R. Nasso, it was known as Seagal/Nasso Productions between 1994 and 2000. This partnership ended in 2002 after Nasso was arrested by the FBI and subsequently charged with the extortion of Seagal, a crime for which Nasso served 10 months in prison.

The company was known as Luminocity Productions from 2001 to 2005.

In addition to films, the company has produced Seagal's TV series Steven Seagal: Lawman and album Mojo Priest.

Selected filmography
 Marked for Death (1990)
 On Deadly Ground (1994)
 Under Siege 2: Dark Territory (1995)
 The Glimmer Man (1996)
 Fire Down Below (1997)
 Into the Sun (2005)
 Shadow Man (2006)
 Flight of Fury (2007)
 Urban Justice (2007)
 Pistol Whipped (2008)
 Kill Switch (2008)
 Against the Dark (2009)
 A Good Man (2014)
 Code of Honor (2016)

Discography
 Mojo Priest (2006)

References 

1990 establishments in California
Companies based in Los Angeles
Film production companies of the United States
Mass media companies established in 1990
Steven Seagal